The 1958–59 season is the 79th season of competitive football by Rangers.

Overview
Rangers played a total of 43 competitive matches during the 1959–60 season.

Results
All results are written with Rangers' score first.

Scottish First Division

Scottish Cup

League Cup

Appearances

See also
 1958–59 in Scottish football
 1958–59 Scottish Cup
 1958–59 Scottish League Cup

References 

Scottish football championship-winning seasons
Rangers F.C. seasons
Rangers